This is a list of athletes and teams who have won honours while representing Cork GAA in Gaelic games (i.e. football, hurling, etc). Cork have achieved the Double in senior hurling and gaelic football in 1890 and 1990. Tipperary in 1895 and 1900 is the only other county to achieve this unique feat. Teddy McCarthy is the only person to hold the unique record of winning two all Ireland senior medals in hurling and gaelic football in the one year. Another Cork man Brian Murphy is the only man in the history of the GAA to win all Ireland medals at senior u21 and minor level in both hurling and gaelic football.

Hurling
All-Irelands (92)

All-Ireland Senior Hurling Championships: 30
 1890, 1892, 1893, 1894, 1902, 1903, 1919, 1926, 1928, 1929, 1931, 1941, 1942, 1943, 1944, 1946, 1952, 1953, 1954, 1966, 1970, 1976,  1977, 1978,  1984,  1986,  1990, 1999, 2004,  2005
All-Ireland Intermediate Hurling Championships: 9
 1965, 1997, 2001, 2003, 2004, 2006, 2009, 2014, 2018
All-Ireland Junior Hurling Championships: 11
 1912, 1916, 1925, 1940, 1947, 1950, 1955, 1958, 1983, 1987, 1994
All-Ireland Under-21/Under-20 Hurling Championships: 13
 1966, 1968, 1969, 1970, 1971, 1973, 1976, 1982, 1988, 1997, 1998, 2020, 2021
All-Ireland Minor Hurling Championships: 19
 1928, 1937, 1938, 1939, 1941, 1951, 1964, 1967, 1969, 1970, 1971, 1974, 1978, 1979, 1985, 1995, 1998, 2001, 2021
All-Ireland Vocational Schools Championship: 9
 1970 (Cork County), 1996, 1997, 1998, 2000, 2005, 2006, 2007, 2008, 2009
Centenary Cup: 1
 1984

Provincials (143)
Munster Senior Hurling Championships: 54
 1888, 1890, 1892, 1893, 1894, 1901, 1902, 1903, 1904, 1905, 1907, 1912, 1915, 1919, 1920, 1926, 1927, 1928, 1929, 1931, 1939, 1942, 1943, 1944, 1946, 1947, 1952, 1953, 1954, 1956, 1966, 1969, 1970, 1972, 1975, 1976, 1977, 1978, 1979, 1982, 1983, 1984, 1985, 1986, 1990, 1992, 1999, 2000, 2003, 2005, 2006, 2014, 2017, 2018
Munster Intermediate Hurling Championships: 15
 1964, 1965, 1967, 1969, 1997, 1999, 2001, 2003, 2004, 2005, 2006, 2009, 2010, 2014, 2015
Munster Junior Hurling Championships: 21
 1912, 1916, 1923, 1925, 1929, 1932, 1937, 1938, 1940, 1947, 1950, 1955, 1958, 1959, 1960, 1983, 1984, 1987, 1992, 1994, 1996
Munster Under-21/Under-20 Hurling Championships: 21
 1966, 1968, 1969, 1970, 1971, 1973, 1975, 1976, 1977, 1982, 1988, 1991, 1993, 1996, 1997, 1998, 2005, 2007, 2018, 2020, 2021
Munster Minor Hurling Championships: 34
 1928, 1936, 1937, 1938, 1939, 1941, 1951, 1964, 1966, 1967, 1968, 1969, 1970, 1971, 1972, 1974, 1975, 1977, 1978, 1979, 1985, 1986, 1988, 1990, 1994, 1995, 1998, 2000, 2004, 2005, 2006, 2008, 2017, 2021

Leagues (14)
National Hurling League Division 1: 14
 1926, 1930, 1940, 1941, 1948, 1953, 1969, 1970, 1972, 1974, 1980, 1981, 1993, 1998

Other (109)
GAA All Stars Awards: 109
1971 (2), 1972 (5), 1974 (2), 1975 (1), 1976 (5), 1977 (8), 1978 (6), 1979 (3), 1980 (2), 1981 (1), 1982 (3), 1983 (3), 1984 (6), 1985 (2), 1986 (7), 1987 (1), 1988 (1), 1990 (6), 1991 (3), 1992 (3), 1993 (2), 1999 (6), 2000 (2), 2003 (3), 2004 (7), 2005 (6), 2006 (2), 2008 (1), 2012 (1), 2013 (3), 2017 (2), 2018 (3), 2019 (1)

Camogie
All-Ireland Senior Camogie Championships: 28
 (click on year for team line-outs) 1934, 1935, 1936, 1939, 1940, 1941, 1970, 1971, 1972, 1973, 1978, 1980, 1982, 1983, 1992, 1993, 1995, 1997, 1998, 2002, 2005, 2006, 2008, 2009, 2014, 2015, 2017, 2018
All-Ireland Intermediate Camogie Championships: 4
 2000, 2002, 2006, 2018
All-Ireland Junior Camogie Championships: 7
 1973, 1980, 1983, 1984, 1996, 1999, 2004
All-Ireland Minor Camogie Championships: 15
 1975, 1976, 1978, 1979, 1980, 1983, 1984, 1985, 1998, 1999, 2001, 2002, 2003, 2018, 2019
National Camogie Leagues: 16
1984, 1986, 1991, 1992, 1995, 1996, 1997, 1998, 1999, 2000, 2001, 2003, 2006, 2007, 2012, 2013

Football
All-Irelands (54)
All-Ireland Senior Football Championships: 7
1890, 1911, 1945, 1973, 1989, 1990, 2010
All-Ireland Under-21 Football Championships: 11
 1970, 1971, 1980, 1981, 1984, 1985, 1986, 1989, 1994, 2007, 2009
All-Ireland Under-20 Football Championships: 1
2019
All-Ireland Minor Football Championships: 11
 1961, 1967, 1968, 1969, 1972, 1974, 1981, 1991, 1993, 2000, 2019
All-Ireland Junior Football Championships: 17
 1951, 1953, 1955, 1964, 1972, 1984, 1987, 1989, 1990, 1993, 1996, 2001, 2005, 2007, 2009, 2011, 2013
All-Ireland Vocational Schools Championships: 6
 1961 (Cork City), 1991, 1994, 2008, 2010, 2012
Dr Croke Cups: 1
 1902

Provincials (132)
Munster Senior Football Championships: 37
 1890, 1891, 1893, 1894, 1897, 1899, 1901, 1906, 1907, 1911, 1916, 1928, 1943, 1945, 1949, 1952, 1956, 1957, 1966, 1967, 1971, 1973, 1974, 1983, 1987, 1988, 1989, 1990, 1993, 1994, 1995, 1999, 2002, 2006, 2008, 2009, 2012
Munster Junior Football Championships: 28
 1911, 1932, 1933, 1940, 1951, 1953, 1955, 1957, 1962, 1964, 1966, 1970, 1971, 1972, 1984, 1986, 1987, 1989, 1990, 1992, 1993, 1996, 2001, 2005, 2007, 2009, 2011, 2013
Munster Under-21 Football Championships: 28
 1963, 1965, 1969, 1970, 1971, 1974, 1979, 1980, 1981, 1982, 1984, 1985, 1986, 1989, 1994, 2001, 2004, 2005, 2006, 2007, 2009, 2011, 2012, 2013, 2014, 2016 2019, 2021
Munster Minor Football Championships: 31
 1939, 1952, 1959, 1960, 1961, 1964, 1966, 1967, 1968, 1969, 1971, 1972, 1973, 1974, 1976, 1977, 1981, 1983, 1985, 1986, 1987, 1991, 1992, 1993, 1999, 2000, 2005, 2007, 2010, 2021, 2022
McGrath Cups: 9
 1998, 1999, 2006, 2007, 2009, 2012, 2014, 2016, 2018

Leagues (12)
National Football League Division 1: 8
1952, 1956, 1980, 1989, 1999, 2010, 2011, 2012
National Football League Division 2: 1
2009
National Football League Division 3: 1
2020
Munster Football League: 2
 1931–32, 1932–33

Ladies' football
All-Ireland Senior Ladies' Football Championships: 11
2005, 2006, 2007, 2008, 2009, 2011, 2012, 2013, 2014, 2015, 2016
All-Ireland Senior B Ladies Football Championship: 1
 2007
All-Ireland Intermediate Ladies' Football Championship: 1
 1998
Ladies' National Football League: 11
2005, 2006, 2008, 2009, 2010, 2011, 2013, 2014, 2015, 2016, 2017
All-Ireland Junior Ladies' Football Championships:  1
1995
All-Ireland Under-18 Ladies' Football Championship:  10
1985, 1988, 2003, 2004, 2006, 2007, 2011, 2015, 2016, 2017,
All-Ireland Under-16 Ladies' Football Championship:  9
 1984, 1986, 2002, 2004, 2005, 2007, 2008, 2013, 2014
All-Ireland Under-14 Ladies' Football Championship: 9
 2000, 2001, 2002, 2003, 2006, 2011, 2012, 2013, 2019

References

Honours